Chlamisus is a genus of cloaked warty leaf beetles in the family Chrysomelidae. There are more than 110 described species in Chlamisus.

See also
 List of Chlamisus species

References

Further reading

 
 

Cryptocephalinae
Articles created by Qbugbot
Chrysomelidae genera